Chess at the 2010 Asian Games was held in Guangzhou Chess Institute, Guangzhou, China from November 13 to 26, 2010 with four individual and team events.

China finished first in the medal table by winning three out of four possible gold medals.

Schedule

Medalists

Medal table

Participating nations
A total of 156 athletes from 25 nations competed in chess at the 2010 Asian Games:

References
chess-results.com

External links
Chess Site of 2010 Asian Games

 
2010 Asian Games events
Asian Games
2010
Asian Games 2010